Bear Creek is a  stream in eastern Sonoma County, California, United States, a tributary of Sonoma Creek.

Course
It descends first to the west and then to the south, emptying into Sonoma Creek just west of Sugarloaf Ridge State Park.

Habitat and pollution
As of 2000, Bear Creek supported steelhead trout.

See also
Graham Creek
List of watercourses in the San Francisco Bay Area
Yulupa Creek

References

Rivers of Sonoma County, California
Rivers of Northern California
Tributaries of Sonoma Creek
St. Helena, California